David Rubinstein may refer to:
 David Rubinstein (social historian) (1932–2019), American social historian
 David Rubinstein (pianist) (born 1949), American pianist
 Dave Rubinstein (1964–1993), American punk musician

See also
David Rubenstein (disambiguation)